The Painter of Sunflowers (in French: Le Peintre de Tournesols) is a portrait of Vincent van Gogh by Paul Gauguin in December 1888.

The painting is exhibited at the Van Gogh Museum in Amsterdam.

Background
The portrait was painted when Gauguin visited Van Gogh in Arles, France. Vincent had pleaded with Gauguin to come to Arles to start an art-colony. Gauguin eventually agreed after funding for the transportation and expenses was provided by Vincent's brother Theo Van Gogh; however Gauguin only stayed for two months as the two often quarreled and the famous incident where Van Gogh severed his left ear with a razor occurred after an argument with Gauguin.

Van Gogh's first impression on seeing the painting was that Gauguin had depicted him as a madman. He later softened his view. "My face has lit up after all a lot since, but it was indeed me, extremely tired and charged with electricity as I was then".

See also
 Van Gogh's Sunflowers series

References

Paintings by Paul Gauguin
1888 paintings
19th-century portraits
Collections of the Van Gogh Museum
Paintings about painting
Works about Vincent van Gogh